Erik Andersson (born 18 September 1986 in Ljungby, Sweden) is a forward for the Borås HC hockey team in the Swedish HockeyAllsvenskan league.

Playing career
On 28 October 2005 Andersson was named the first in the line of four candidates for Elitserien Rookie Of The Year 2006. The award was eventually won by forward Nicklas Bäckström.

After playing two seasons for HV71, Andersson signed with Timrå IK for 2 years on 10 April 2007. Andersson left on 7 May 2009 Timrå IK and signed with HockeyAllsvenskan club Borås HC.

Awards and achievements
Elitserien 2005-06 Rookie of the Year Nominee in 2005.

References

External links
 

1986 births
Borås HC players
HV71 players
IF Troja/Ljungby players
IF Sundsvall Hockey players
Living people
Swedish ice hockey centres
Timrå IK players